Maya Glezarova (Russian: Майя Глезарова), (10 December, 1924, Moscow, Russia - 16 July, 2017, Moscow, Russia) was a violinist and a professor.

Biography
Glezarova graduated from the Moscow Conservatory in 1949, where she studied with Lev Tseitlin. In 1955, she was invited by Yuri Yankelevich to teach at his class. As Yankelevich's assistant, Glezarova taught Pavel Kogan, Vladimir Spivakov, Vladimir Landsman, Dmitry Sitkovetsky, and Mikhail Kopelman. After Yankelevich's death in 1973, she led her own studio. Among her pupils were Natalya Boyarskaya, Yuri Torchinsky, Vasko Vassilev and Julia Krasko.

References

1924 births
2017 deaths
Russian violinists
Moscow Conservatory alumni
Violin pedagogues
Academic staff of Moscow Conservatory
Women classical violinists